Jore Pokhri Wildlife Sanctuary is situated in Darjeeling District, West Bengal. It is the habitat of some high-altitude animals like Himalayan Salamander (Tylototriton verrucosus), locally known as 'Gora'. Many animals and birds are found there. Jore Pokhari is a small village on a hilltop which is almost 20 kilometers away from Darjeeling town. The main feature of Jore Pokhri is the twin lakes after which the place is named. Jore means two in Nepali and Pokhri means Lake. The boundary of one lake is surrounded with seating arrangements for visitors, and there is a huge model of snake in the middle of the lake.

There are several temples in the area as well as rare Himalayan Salamanders, swans and monkeys. Once the Salamanders were considered totally extinct, but examples were found in Jore Pokhri in 1964.

Jore Pokhri is also near to Northeast Nepal boarder in a distant of 18 kilometers which is known as Pashupati.

References
 West Bengal Wildlife Sanctuaries

Wildlife sanctuaries in West Bengal
Tourist attractions in Darjeeling district
Protected areas established in 1964
1964 establishments in West Bengal